Schauensee Castle is a castle in the municipality of Kriens of the Canton of Lucerne in Switzerland.

History
It was first mentioned in the 13th century in connection with the Knight Rudolf von Schauensee (1257-1317) and was probably built in the 13th century.  By the beginning of the 14th century it was already in ruins.  At the end of the 16th century, Johannes von Mettenwyl acquired the complex and rebuilt it, retaining only the tower from the original castle.  In 1750 it was rebuilt to its current appearance under the "Meyer von Schauensee" family.

The municipality of Kriens was able to acquire the "Schlössli" in 1963. Today, the castle is used for cultural events and as a reception hall.

See also
 List of castles in Switzerland

References

Castles in the canton of Lucerne